Lara Serena Roque Ortaleza-Cipriano (born December 6, 1982), professionally known as Chynna Ortaleza, is a Filipino actress, television host, and model. She is currently a contract star of GMA Network. She is also Vice President for Production & Artist Management for OC Records a fast rising music & entertainment agency in the Philippines.

Career
Ortaleza landed her first TV gig as a junior reporter on the children's magazine show 5 and Up. She left the show after three years to concentrate on her studies. She returned to acting after graduating from high school, when she became known as Sprite's Kitikitxt girl via a popular TV commercial that launched her showbusiness career.

Ortaleza was later cast as Mimi on GMA Network's teen drama, Click, where she starred next to Richard Gutierrez.

In 2004, Ortaleza began to focus on her hosting career. After the success of the first season of StarStruck, Ortaleza hosted the StarStruck'''s Friday live show, Stage 1 Live, with Cogie Domingo and Raymond Gutierrez. Stage 1 Live was cancelled after one season. She was then added to the new youth segment of SOP (Sobrang Okey Pare), titled as SOP Gimikada then changed to SOP Gigsters. She was then cast as host in the second season of 3R with Iza Calzado and Bettina Carlos. She was also a cast member of Joyride.

In 2010 to 2012, she played more than five major villainess character roles.

In 2013, Chynna Ortaleza was cast as the hard-hearted and soft-spoken Minerva on Kakambal ni Eliana, along with Sherilyn Reyes-Tan and Lexi Fernandez, the three of them are the lead villains to the main heroine, Eliana. Ortaleza's character in the end became snake and tries to murder Eliana as a revenge for Nora's demise (Sherilyn Reyes-Tan).

In 2005, Ortaleza appeared in the first issue of Pump Magazine. She was also a part of Metro Magazine and FHM's "100 Sexiest Women in the World."

Ortaleza then starred in the soap opera Sugo and joined the MTV VJ Hunt to become one of the 16 finalists.

Though she did not win the title, she got the People Choice awards.

For the year 2006, Ortaleza was on the list again of FHM 100 sexiest women.

In 2014 she played as Colleen on Second Chances and on 2018 she played the kind-hearted and tough Lynette on Victor Magtanggol. Her Lynette character was slightly hateful to her mother for abandoning them but later learns to forgive her.

 Personal life 
In November 2015, Ortaleza married singer and actor Kean Cipriano. On April 20, 2016, the couple had their first child daughter named Stellar. The name of their daughter was inspired by one of the songs of their favorite band Incubus. On September 25, 2019, Ortaleza gave birth to their son, Salem. The name of their son means "peace" in Hebrew.

 Filmography 

Television

Films
(2014) #Y as Abby
(2014) Hustisya as Kristal
(2014) Dementia as Olivia
(2014) Basement as Angela
(2013) Ano Ang Kulay Ng Mga Nakalimutang Pangarap? as Monette
(2013) Menor de Edad as Nancy
(2012) Migrante as Edna
(2009) Forget Me Not as Karla
(2005) Kilig, Pintig, Yanig as Mitch
(2004) Kuya as Jill
(2003) Mano Po 2: My Home as Yna
(2002) Bakit Papa'' as Chiqui

Awards and nominations

References

External links
 
 https://www.gmanetwork.com/sparkle/artists/chynnaortaleza

1982 births
Filipino film actresses
Filipino television actresses
VJs (media personalities)
Living people
People from Quezon City
Actresses from Metro Manila
University of Santo Tomas alumni
Filipino women comedians
GMA Network personalities